Christopher Harrison (1780–1868) was the first Lieutenant Governor of Indiana.

Christopher or Chris Harrison may also refer to:

 Christopher Harrison (cricketer) (1847–1932), English cricketer
 Christopher Harrison (water polo) (born 1957), Australian former water polo player
 Christopher Calvin Harrison (born 1961), American director and choreographer
 Christopher Guy Harrison (1960–2020), British furniture designer
 Chris Harrison (born 1971), American television presenter best known as the longtime host of The Bachelor for its first 25 seasons
 Chris Harrison (American football) (born 1972), American football guard
 Chris Harrison (baseball coach), former American baseball coach
 Chris Harrison (computer scientist) (born 1984), British-born professor of human–computer interaction
 Chris Harrison (footballer) (born 1956), retired English footballer
 Chris Harrison (photographer) (born 1967), British photographer
 Chris Harrison, a character in Flash Forward